These are the results of the 2016 Asian Wrestling Championships which took place between 17 February and 21 February 2016 in Bangkok, Thailand.

Men's freestyle

57 kg
20 February

61 kg
21 February

65 kg
20 February

70 kg
21 February

74 kg
20 February

86 kg
21 February

97 kg
20 February

125 kg
21 February

Men's Greco-Roman

59 kg
18 February

66 kg
17 February

71 kg
18 February

75 kg
17 February

80 kg
17 February

85 kg
18 February

98 kg
17 February

130 kg
17 February

Women's freestyle

48 kg
19 February

53 kg
19 February

55 kg
19 February

58 kg
20 February

60 kg
19 February

63 kg
18 February

69 kg
19 February

75 kg
18 February

References

External links
Official website

2016 Results